Stenoptilia amseli is a moth of the family Pterophoridae. It is known from Saudi Arabia and Yemen.

References

amseli
Moths of the Arabian Peninsula
Moths described in 1990